The AeroAndina MXP-158 Embera is a Colombian ultralight aircraft that was designed and produced by AeroAndina of Cali. The aircraft was available ready-to fly.

The MXP-158 is no longer in production.

Design and development
The aircraft was designed to comply with the Fédération Aéronautique Internationale microlight rules and is noted for its robust design and ability to handle rough field operations. It features a strut-braced high-wing, a two-seats-in-side-by-side configuration enclosed cockpit, tricycle landing gear and a single engine in tractor configuration.

The aircraft is made from aluminum sheet. Its  span wing is supported by V-struts and jury struts. The standard engine available was the  Rotax 912UL four-stroke powerplant.

Specifications (MXP-158 Embera)

References

1990s Colombian ultralight aircraft
Single-engined tractor aircraft
High-wing aircraft